Gothuruth is a village in the state of Kerala, India, is located in the Ernakulam district, Paravur Taluk.

See also
Paravur Taluk
Ernakulam
Ernakulam District
Kochi

References